Tropical Storm Odette was a rare off-season tropical cyclone that hit the island of Hispaniola in early December 2003. As the fifteenth named storm of the 2003 Atlantic hurricane season, Odette formed near the coast of Panama a few days after the official end of the Atlantic hurricane season ended on November 30, and ultimately made landfall on the Dominican Republic as a moderate tropical storm, before becoming extratropical on December 7, dissipating two days later.

The storm caused heavy damage throughout the Dominican Republic from unusually heavy rainfall in December. Preparation preceding Odette's landfall resulted in only eight deaths and 14 injuries. Total damage is unknown, though crop damage in the Dominican Republic totaled to over $8 million (2003 USD, $ million  USD).

Meteorological history

By November 30, the last day of the Atlantic hurricane season, a stationary front extended across eastern Cuba into the southwestern Caribbean. On December 1, a low-pressure area developed within the frontal zone just north of Panama, and an anticyclone aloft produced good outflow over the low-level center. The low remained nearly stationary for the next several days, and it gradually became separated from the stationary front. Convection increased across the area due to moisture from the eastern Pacific Ocean and moderate divergence. Increased wind shear deteriorated the system on December 2, though convection redeveloped as the system started a northeast drift.

Upon being classified as a tropical cyclone, the depression was embedded within the southwesterly flow between a ridge over the eastern Caribbean Sea and a mid-latitude trough, which caused a steady east-northeast motion. The convection organized into a central dense overcast with a well-defined cloud band wrapping partially around the center, and based on satellite imagery estimates the depression was upgraded to tropical storm status; late on December 4, the National Hurricane Center named the storm Odette. After being named, the storm intensified despite moderate southwesterly wind shear, and an eye feature became evident on microwave satellite imagery. Additionally, about three–fourths of a mid-level eyewall developed. The eye feature diminished as the convective structure deteriorated slightly, and hurricane hunters first flew into the storm at around 1200 UTC on December 5. Odette tracked over an area of warm sea surface temperatures, and the overall cloud pattern gradually improved; the Geophysical Fluid Dynamics Laboratory predicted the storm to attain hurricane status. Early on December 6, a TRMM overpass showed an 80% closed eyewall, and at 0600 UTC Odette attained peak winds of  while located about /h) southwest of Santo Domingo, Dominican Republic.

Upon reaching peak intensity, Odette had begun accelerating northeastward, which decreased wind shear and slightly increased its southwesterly outflow. The low-level center decelerated as it approached Hispaniola, though the convection continued quickly northeastward. It accelerated to the northeast ahead of an approaching cold front, and late on December 7 Odette transitioned into an extratropical cyclone as its center became embedded within the front. The remnants continued quickly northeastward before losing its identity within the frontal zone on December 9; the frontal zone that absorbed Odette also absorbed Tropical Storm Peter a few days later.

Preparations
Prior to Odette's predicted arrival, the Dominican Republic government issued for the evacuation of more than 10,000 people, mostly from those living near rivers. At least 2,000 shelters were set up, capable of housing up to 800,000 people. In addition, the government mobilized the army to force those unwilling to leave from their homes. Such precautions were taken due to already saturated grounds from heavy rainfall three weeks prior.

A tropical storm watch was issued between Santo Domingo and the Dominican Republic/Haiti border on December 4, 56 hours prior to landfall. This was raised to a tropical storm warning on December 5 while 32 hours before landfall. In addition, tropical storm warnings were issued for all of the Haitian coastline and Jamaica.

Impact
While over the southwestern Caribbean Sea, Odette dropped heavy rainfall, including prior to its formation. For several days, the storm caused rains in Panama, Costa Rica, and the east coast of Nicaragua. In Jamaica, the storm dropped moderate rainfall, flooding several roads in Saint Ann and Saint Mary Parishes. Odette caused moderate damage and 8 deaths in the Dominican Republic.

Dominican Republic

Winds from Tropical Storm Odette were relatively light across the Dominican Republic, with a peak gust of 60 mph occurring in Santo Domingo. Several other locations reported over 4 inches as well. The rainfall caused mudslides and flash flooding, forcing several rivers to overflow in combination with previous rains. In addition, a tornado was reported near Santo Domingo, destroying one house and uproofing several others.

The flooding and mudslides damaged up to 60,000 homes and destroyed 34. Gusty winds caused power outages. River flooding caused two bridges to collapse, isolating several communities. Landslides buried several roads, though authorities quickly repaired them. The rainfall also flooded fields, resulting in severe crop damage. As much as 85% of the banana crop was lost, while the coffee crop suffered losses shortly before harvest season. Crop damage totaled to around $8 million (2003 USD). In addition, excess flooding contaminated water supplies, leaving several areas without clean water or sanitation.

In all, Tropical Storm Odette caused 8 deaths and 14 injuries, mostly due to flash flooding and mudslides. In addition, two indirect deaths are associated with the storm due to heart attacks. Neighboring Haiti experienced little from the storm.

Puerto Rico and United States Virgin Islands

Though Odette passed 280 miles to the west of Mayagüez, Puerto Rico, the storm caused moderate rainfall across Puerto Rico and the United States Virgin Islands.

Odette's rainfall caused flooding throughout Puerto Rico's rivers. The river flooding destroyed three bridges, resulting in $20,000 in damages (2003 USD). The flooding also caused a mudslide near a cemetery in Humacao. The rainfall also covered numerous roads, though overall damage was minimal throughout Puerto Rico and the Virgin Islands.

Aftermath and records
In all, 65,000 people were affected by Tropical Storm Odette. The Dominican Republic Red Cross and Red Crescent deployed 105 volunteers to the impacted areas, primarily in the area of Monte Cristi. The organization provided food and hygiene kits to thousands of people, as well as mosquito nets. The Red Cross also gave a 5,000 liter water tank for the citizens in Monte Cristi, an area without clean water or sanitation.

When Odette formed on December 4, it became the first tropical storm since the beginning of the modern tropical cyclone record to form in the Caribbean in the month of December; a documented December Caribbean hurricane occurred in 1822. However, Tropical Storm Karen, which formed in November 1989, persisted until December while located in the northwestern Caribbean Sea. In addition, Odette was the first Atlantic storm to form in the month of December since Hurricane Lili in 1984.

The 2003 season was the first season since 1954 to have a pre-season storm and a post-season storm, with Ana in April and Odette.

See also

 List of off-season Atlantic hurricanes
 List of tropical cyclones
 List of wettest tropical cyclones by country
 For other storms of the same name
 Hurricane Lenny
 Hurricane Omar

References

External links 
 

Odette
Odette (2003)
Odette (2003)
Odette (2003)
Odette